Benedict A. Majekodunmi (born 12 January 1940) is a Nigerian sprinter. He competed in the men's 100 metres at the 1972 Summer Olympics. Majekodunmi won a bronze medal in the 4 x 100 metres relay at the 1974 British Commonwealth Games.

References

External links
 

1940 births
Living people
Athletes (track and field) at the 1968 Summer Olympics
Athletes (track and field) at the 1972 Summer Olympics
Nigerian male sprinters
Olympic athletes of Nigeria
Commonwealth Games bronze medallists for Nigeria
Commonwealth Games medallists in athletics
Athletes (track and field) at the 1966 British Empire and Commonwealth Games
Athletes (track and field) at the 1970 British Commonwealth Games
Athletes (track and field) at the 1974 British Commonwealth Games
Place of birth missing (living people)
20th-century Nigerian people
Medallists at the 1974 British Commonwealth Games